This is a list of candidates for the 1910 New South Wales state election. The election was held on 14 October 1910.

Retiring Members

Liberal
Charles Barton MLA (Macquarie)
Ernest Broughton MLA (King)
William Mahony MLA (Annandale)
Richard McCoy MLA (Marrickville)

Independent
Albert Collins MLA (Namoi)

Legislative Assembly
Sitting members are shown in bold text. Successful candidates are highlighted in the relevant colour. Where there is possible confusion, an asterisk (*) is also used.

See also
 Members of the New South Wales Legislative Assembly, 1910–1913

References
 

1910